is a 1978 Japanese psychological drama directed by Yoshitarō Nomura and written by Masato Ide, based on the novel by Seichō Matsumoto.

Plot
Consumed by the jealousy and power struggles of their own relationships, a man, his mistress and his wife involve three children in their own games-with tragic results. After Sōkichi stops providing his mistress with monetary support, she leaves her three children with him, whom she insists are also his, and disappears. Sōkichi is bewildered and his wife is livid. With regard only for their own discomfort, they go about remedying their situation.

Cast
 Ken Ogata as Sōkichi Takeshita
 Shima Iwashita as Oume, Sōkichi's wife
 Mayumi Ogawa as Kikuyo, Sōkichi's lover
 Hiroki Iwase as Riichi, Sōkichi and Kikuyo's 1st son

Awards
1979 Awards of the Japanese Academy
Won
Best Actor - Ken Ogata
Best Director - Yoshitarō Nomura
Nominated
Best Film
Best Music Score - Yasushi Akutagawa
Best Screenplay - Masato Ide
1979 Blue Ribbon Awards
Best Actor - Ken Ogata
Best Director - Yoshitarō Nomura
1978 Hochi Film Awards
Best Actor - Ken Ogata
1979 Kinema Junpo Awards
Best Actor - Ken Ogata
1979 Mainichi Film Concours
Best Actor - Ken Ogata
Best Art Direction - Kyohei Morita
Best Cinematography - Takashi Kawamata

References

External links
 
 
 

1978 films
Japanese psychological drama films
1970s Japanese-language films
1970s psychological drama films
Films based on Japanese novels
Films set in Saitama Prefecture
Shochiku films
Films directed by Yoshitaro Nomura
Films scored by Yasushi Akutagawa
1978 drama films
1970s Japanese films